The Tenor Stylings of Bill Barron is the debut album by saxophonist Bill Barron which was recorded in 1961 and first released on the Savoy label. The album was reissued on CD combined with Modern Windows in 2000.

Reception 

In his review on Allmusic, Michael G. Nastos called stated "This recording displays all the why's and wherefore's as to his unsung greatness, showcasing his clever compositions and his clear, distinct, definite tenor tone that holds allegiance to no peer or predecessor" All About Jazz noted "The Tenor Stylings Of Bill Barron somehow was engineered for sharper and more assertive sound reproduction, clarifying the roles of the instruments within each piece. Furthermore, the compositions on the album are based upon single themes for the most part".

Track listing 
All compositions by Bill Barron
 "Blast Off" – 9:37
 "Ode to an Earth Girl" – 7:33
 "Fox Hunt" – 7:07
 "Oriental Impressions" – 6:24
 "Back Lash" – 5:47
 "Nebulae" – 6:18
 "Desolation" – 5:21 Bonus track on reissue

Personnel 
Bill Barron – tenor saxophone
Ted Curson – trumpet
Kenny Barron – piano
Jimmy Garrison – bass
Frankie Dunlop – drums

References 

1961 albums
Savoy Records albums
Bill Barron (musician) albums